Maison Des Jeunes is a 2013 album by musician Damon Albarn in collaboration with African musicians for the Africa Express project that Albarn launched in early 2013.

Background
In October 2013, Damon Albarn spearheaded a week-long trip to Mali by a group of musicians including Brian Eno, Yeah Yeah Yeahs' Nick Zinner, members of Metronomy and Django Django, Holy Other, Lil Silva, Cid Rim, Two Inch Punch, and more. There, they collaborated with Malian musicians. The result is an album called Africa Express Presents: Maison Des Jeunes, released digitally on 9 December via Transgressive.

The record is a continuation of Albarn's Africa Express project, where western and African artists collaborate. (The previous year it resulted in a train tour across the UK). It was recorded in a temporary studio set up in a city youth club called Maison Des Jeunes.

There was an album launch event on 9 December at London's Oval Space, featuring debut UK performances by Songhoy Blues and Kankou Kouyaté, plus Ghostpoet, Metronomy's Olugbenga Adelekan, and Django Django's David Maclean. It also feature the UK premiere of the documentary on the 2012 Africa Express train tour.

Track list

References

2013 albums
Damon Albarn albums